Corryocactus is a genus of cacti. The genus was formerly placed in the tribe Notocacteae. It has also been placed in the tribe Echinocereeae. A 2011  molecular phylogenetic study excluded the genus from the "core" Echinocereeae, commenting that it lay "outside of a well-supported larger clade in our analysis".

Species

Synonymy
The following genera have been brought into synonymy with this genus:
Corryocereus Fric & Kreuz. (orth. var.)
Erdisia Britton & Rose
Eulychnocactus Backeb. (nom. inval.)

References

External links
 Corryocactus ayacuchoensis photo
 Corryocactus brevistylus subsp. puquiensis photo

 
Cactoideae genera